John Rocco "Bulldog" Panelli (May 7, 1926 – March 2, 2012) was an American football player. He played college football at the University of Notre Dame. He went on to play two seasons in the National Football League (NFL) for the Detroit Lions, and another three for the Chicago Cardinals.

Born and raised in Morristown, New Jersey, Panelli starred at Morristown High School, earning all-state honors as a student and a nomination by The Star-Ledger decades after his graduation for inclusion on its All-Century team.

Panelli died after a sudden illness on March 2, 2012. He was 85.

References

External links
 
 

1926 births
2012 deaths
American football fullbacks
American football linebackers
Detroit Lions players
Chicago Cardinals players
Morristown High School (Morristown, New Jersey) alumni
Notre Dame Fighting Irish football players
People from Morristown, New Jersey
Sportspeople from Oakland County, Michigan
Players of American football from New Jersey
Sportspeople from Morris County, New Jersey